The Medill School of Journalism, Media, Integrated Marketing Communications  is a constituent school of Northwestern University that offers both undergraduate and graduate programs. It frequently ranks as one of the top school of journalism in the United States. Medill alumni include 40 Pulitzer Prize laureates, numerous national correspondents for major networks, many well-known reporters, columnists and media executives.

Northwestern is one of the few schools embracing a technological approach towards journalism.
Medill received a Knight Foundation grant to establish the Knight News Innovation Laboratory in 2011. The Knight Lab is a joint initiative of Medill and the McCormick School of Engineering at Northwestern, one of the first to combine journalism and computer science.

Description
The Medill School was founded in 1921, and named after Joseph Medill (1823–1899), owner and editor of the Chicago Tribune, which was then run by his grandsons Robert R. McCormick and Joseph Medill Patterson.

The journalism program offers Bachelor of Science and Master of Science degrees. The undergraduate curriculum requires a broad liberal arts education as well as the study and practice of journalism. The one-year master's curriculum is an intensive hands-on with students specializing in either: Health, Environment and Science; Magazine; Media Innovation and Content Strategy; Politics, Policy and Foreign Affairs; Social Justice and Investigative Reporting; Sports Media; or Video and Broadcast.

The Integrated Marketing Communications program offers a Master of Science degree and Undergraduate Certificate. The graduate level program has full-time, part-time and online options. Full-time students can pursue a specialization, choosing from brand strategy, content marketing, digital and interactive marketing, marketing analytics, strategic communications and media management.

Medill undergraduates participate in a journalism residency for one quarter in their junior or senior year, during which they intern in a professional newsroom or media organization. Media outlets across the United States — and in some cases, overseas — have participated in this program.

Medill is headquartered on the southern end of Northwestern's campus in Evanston, Illinois, but it also opened a program in 2008, at the branch campus Northwestern University in Qatar. Northwestern’s also has a San Francisco campus, located at 44 Montgomery St., right in the city’s Financial District. It opened in fall 2016 and is a partnership between both Medill and Northwestern’s McCormick School of Engineering and Applied Science.
For many years the school's main location was in Fisk Hall. In fall 2002, the school opened the McCormick Foundation Center (formerly the McCormick Tribune Center), which features a professional-grade TV studio and multimedia classrooms for Medill's growing emphasis on new forms of media. It was generally known as the Medill School of Journalism. To reflect the broader focus the faculty approved the expanded name "Medill School of Journalism, Media, Integrated Marketing Communications" in late 2010, and the new name was approved by the university board of trustees in March 2011.

Medill Knight Lab

Medill is known for graduates who "mix high-tech savvy with hard-nosed reporting skills".
The Knight Lab is a joint initiative of Northwestern's Medill School of Journalism and the Robert R. McCormick School of Engineering and Applied Science funded by the John S. and James L. Knight Foundation announced in 2011. It combines the disciplines of journalism and computer science together to establish a "media innovation lab", one of the few of its kind in the country. According to Northwestern's press release:
"Among the Knight Lab's goals is to maximize use of open-source software already developed through the Knight News Challenge, a $25 million worldwide media innovation contest now in its fifth year, as well as from other grantees from Knight Foundation's $100 million media innovation initiative...Those include projects such as Open Block, an aggregator of public information; Document Cloud, for managing and displaying original documents; Public Insight Journalism, which helps newsrooms tap the wisdom of the community to find better news sources; and Spot.Us, a new way of "crowd-funding" journalism."

Medill Justice Project

The Medill Justice Project, originally known as the Medill Innocence Project, began in 1999, as an effort by Medill faculty and students to reinvestigate murder convictions in Illinois and determine if people were wrongly convicted. This effort has helped to free 11 innocent men, including Anthony Porter and the Ford Heights Four. Medill Justice Project work is credited with prompting Illinois Governor George Ryan to suspend the death penalty and commute all death sentences in 2003.

In 1999, the project successfully worked to free Anthony Porter, who had been convicted of killing two people. Alstory Simon made a video confession to the crimes, encouraged by the Medill Justice Project and a private investigator. Simon pleaded guilty and was eventually sentenced to 37 years. However, in 2014, authorities exonerated Simon and freed him from prison. Anita Alvarez, of the Cook County State's Attorney's Office, criticized David Protess, the Innocence Project founder and director, and long-time Medill journalism professor. Prosecutors said Protess, private investigator Paul Ciolino, and Medill students manipulated Simon into making the confession. The Innocence Project allegedly told Simon he could be executed, said he could earn money from book deals if he cooperated, and falsely claimed there was a witness who implicated Simon. The Medill Innocence Project has been accused of framing Alstory Simon for the murders. In 2015, Simon sued Northwestern for $40 million; the case was settled in 2018 for an undisclosed amount.

From 2009 to 2011, the project was involved in a dispute with the Cook County, Illinois state's attorney over the handling of the Anthony McKinney case. The university claimed reporter's privilege in resisting a subpoena for Justice Project records of the case, while the state claimed the project had been acting as investigators in behalf of McKinney's counsel. Medill faculty member David Protess was suspended during this dispute. In 2011, Protess left to found the Chicago Innocence Project and blog for the Huffington Post while the school gave up the records.

In February 2018, Medill Justice Project Director Alec Klein was accused of bullying and sexual harassment by multiple former students and employees. Klein "categorically" denied the allegations and took a leave of absence during the university's investigation. Klein resigned from his position and left the university in August.

Spiegel Research Center
The Medill IMC Spiegel Digital & Database Research Center is the first research center at Medill. Founded in 2011, it is funded by a gift from the late Ted Spiegel, Medill professor emeritus and member of the family who founded the Spiegel (catalog), and his wife Audrey. The center focuses on evidence-based, data driven analysis to prove the connection between customer engagement and purchase behavior.

Medill News Service

Chicago 
Medill operates a working newsroom in downtown Chicago as part of its graduate journalism program. Graduate students have been providing news coverage to client newspapers since 1995. Each quarter, student reporters are assigned to cover stories about city and county government, the events in state and federal courts, business and economic development, health and science issues and the arts and sports.

Washington, DC
Every Medill News Service journalist also has the opportunity to spend a quarter in a Washington, DC, covering breaking news as well as in-depth, enterprise stories on politics, civil rights, energy, technology or education. Medill journalists attend congressional proceedings, press conferences, conventions and congressional hearings and connect those stories to the communities they cover—not an insider audience.

The Medill News Service serves newspapers, Web sites, television stations and radio stations, which all pay a quarterly fee to help cover production and communications costs. Print correspondents transmit stories electronically every day. Television stories are sent by network feed or satellite, or shipped overnight, as each station requires.

San Francisco campus
For Medill IMC students or Master's Journalism students of the Media Innovation and Entrepreneurship (MIE) specialization, a new campus in downtown San Francisco opened in September 2016 to facilitate special curricula during one quarter of their program.

For Medill MIE students, this campus is the epicenter of their studies related to human-centered design, the business of startups, and learning to code and work within a tech-industry company. While taking courses related to creating startups, students also work 2 days a week with a practicum company (internship).

"Quotegate" controversy

In a February 11, 2008 column written for the Daily Northwestern, Medill senior David Spett questioned the use of anonymous sources by Dean John Lavine in a letter Lavine wrote for Medill's alumni magazine. Lavine attributed a quote praising a Medill marketing class to "a Medill junior" in the class. Spett reportedly called all 29 students enrolled in the class, including all five Medill juniors, and according to Spett, all denied saying the quote. Lavine denied fabricating the quote in a February 20 email to students, but expressed regret for what he called "poor judgment" in not keeping his notes.

The so-called "Quotegate" controversy was the focus of stories, columns and editorials in local and national media, including the Chicago Tribune, the Chicago Sun-Times, The Washington Post and Editor & Publisher.

Awards
Medill alumni have won:

 40 Pulitzer Awards'
 6 American Business Media Jesse H. Neal Awards
 71 National Academy of Television Arts and Sciences Emmy Awards (NATAS)
 5 Public Relations Society of America Anvil Awards
 9 University of Georgia George Foster Peabody Awards
 11 American Society of Magazine Editors' National Magazine Awards
 2 International Association of Business Communicators Gold Quill Awards
 7 Columbia University Alfred I. duPont Awards
 1 Academy (Oscar) Award

Notable alumni

The school recognizes alumni "whose distinctive careers have had positive impacts on their fields" with its Hall of Achievement award, as well as alumni who have been awarded a Pulitzer Prize.

 J. A. Adande, ESPN personality and former Los Angeles Times columnist
 Steve Albini, Musician, record producer and audio engineer. Most famous for playing guitar in Big Black and producing Nirvana's third album In Utero.
 Peter Applebome (M.S.J. 1974), reporter at The New York Times
 Jabari Asim, columnist, The Washington Post
 Gillian Flynn, author, (Gone Girl)
 David Barstow, Pulitzer Prize-winning investigative reporter for The New York Times
 Sy Bartlett, author and Hollywood screenwriter
 Roger Bell, former Vice President of News at KCBS-TV and KABC-TV in Los Angeles and Executive Producer of News for WNBC-TV in New York
 Steve Bell (M.S.J. 1963), former correspondent for ABC News
 Naftali Bendavid, Congress reporter Wall Street Journal
 Ira Berkow (M.S.J. 1964), Pulitzer Prize nominated (1988) and winning (2001) sports reporter, columnist and features writer, The New York Times
 Ari Berman, writer for The Nation and author of Herding Donkeys
 Kai Bird (M.S.J. 1975), Pulitzer Prize-winning author and columnist
 Kevin Blackistone (B.S.J. 1981), ESPN contributor, Around the Horn; The Dallas Morning News sports columnist
 Valerie Boyd (B.S.J. 1985), author of Wrapped in Rainbows: The Life of Zora Neale Hurston; former Atlanta Journal-Constitution arts editor
 Christine Brennan (B.S.J. 1980, M.S. 1981), sports columnist, USA Today
 Hal Buell, former head of photography service at the Associated Press
 Elisabeth Bumiller, The New York Times reporter, former White House Correspondent
 Ben Burns (B.S.J. 1934), founding editor of Ebony and Jet
 David Callaway, former editor-in-chief of USA Today
 David Chalian, deputy political director, ABC News
 Joie Chen, Al Jazeera America Correspondent
 Anupama Chopra, Indian film critic, and host of The Front Row on "Star World"
 Cindy Chupack, executive producer and writer of Sex and the City
 Jim Cummins (1945–2007), NBC News correspondent
 Paul Dana (1975–2006), Indy Race Car driver
 Frank DeCaro, radio personality at OutQ (Sirius XM)
 R. Bruce Dold, editor of The Chicago Tribune
 Jonathan Eig, reporter, editor, author
 Rich Eisen, NFL Network anchor
 Judith Lynn Ferguson, author of 65 cookery books, cookery editor of Woman's Realm magazine, and Head of Diploma Course at Le Cordon Bleu- London
 Robin Fields, investigative reporter ProPublica
 James Foley, journalist
 David T. Friendly, film producer (Little Miss Sunshine)
 Jack Fuller, Pulitzer Prize-winner and former editor and publisher of the Chicago Tribune
 Joshua Green, (M.S.J. 1998), senior national correspondent, Bloomberg Businessweek
 Lauren Green, religion correspondent, FOX News Channel
 Mike Greenberg, sports broadcaster for ESPN
 Jennifer Hale (sportscaster), sports broadcaster for Fox Sports
 Deepti Hajela, journalist for Associated Press
 Jon Heyman, senior baseball writer for Sports Illustrated and MLB Network insider
 Kwame Holman, producer, correspondent for PBS NewsHour and producer, reporter for WTOC-TV 
 Cassidy Hubbarth, sports anchor for ESPN
 Stephen Hunter, Pulitzer Prize-winning film critic for The Washington Post and novelist
 Michael Isikoff, investigative reporter, Newsweek
 David Israel, columnist Washington Star, Chicago Tribune, Los Angeles Herald Examiner, former sportswriter Chicago Daily News
 Jeff Jarvis, media executive, blogger, professor, author
 Clara Jeffery, editor of Mother Jones magazine
 Omar Jimenez, reporter & correspondent for CNN
 Sherry Jones (M.S.J. 1971), senior producer, Frontline
 Dorothy Misener Jurney, called "the godmother of women's pages"
 Clinton Kelly, (M.S.J. 1993), co-host of TLC's What Not To Wear
 Hank Klibanoff (M.S.J. 1973), former managing editor of the Atlanta Journal-Constitution and Pulitzer Prize-winning co-author of The Race Beat: The Press, the Civil Rights Struggle, and the Awakening of a Nation
 Michelle Kosinski, correspondent for CNN, formerly of NBC News
 Vincent Laforet, Pulitzer Prize–winning photographer for The New York Times
 Nicole Lapin, an anchor for CNBC
 Michael Lazerow, entrepreneur and co-founder of Buddy Media, Inc.
 Elisabeth Leamy, 13-time Emmy award-winning correspondent for ABC News and The Dr. Oz Show
 Frank Main, Pulitzer Prize–winning reporter for Chicago Sun Times
 Garry Marshall, writer, director, producer, and actor (Happy Days, Pretty Woman, The Princess Diaries)
 George R.R. Martin, science fiction and fantasy author (A Song of Ice and Fire)
 Luke Matheny (B.S.J. 1997), Academy Award-winner, actor, writer, and director (God of Love)
 Britt McHenry, Fox News personality
 Alvera Mickelsen (M.S.J.), writer, journalism professor, advocate of Christian feminism and co-founder of Christians for Biblical Equality (CBE)
 Matt Murray, editor-in-chief of The Wall Street Journal
 Brent Musburger, sports broadcaster
 Vinita Nair, former co-anchor of ABC World News Now
 Kuldip Nayar, Indian journalist, Syndicated columnist, human rights activist, author and former High Commissioner of India to the United Kingdom
 Rachel Nichols, ESPN and The Washington Post reporter
 Gabriel Okara, pioneering West African poet
 Susan Page, Washington Bureau Chief, USA Today
 Barry Petersen, foreign correspondent, CBS News
 Neal Pollack, satirist, journalist and author (Alternadad)
 Seth Porges, technology writer, television commentator, Popular Mechanics editor
 Allissa Richardson, NABJ Journalism Professor of the Year, Bowie State University
 James Risen, Pulitzer Prize-winning investigative journalist, The New York Times
 Katie Rogers, White House correspondent, The New York Times
 David Ropeik, international consultant in risk perception
 Tina Rosenberg, Pulitzer Prize-winning author and journalist
 Caitlin Rother (B.S.J. 1987), New York Times best-selling author, Pulitzer Prize-nominated journalist
 Joe Ruklick, professional basketball player, writer for The Chicago Defender
 Roxana Saberi, Freelance journalist jailed in Iran on accusations of espionage
 Adam Schefter, ESPN Senior Football Reporter
 Anatole Shub, journalist for The Washington Post and The New York Times, author
 David Sirota, contributing writer for Salon.com, radio host
 Jane Skinner, former anchor for Fox News Channel
 Evan Smith, CEO and editor-in-chief of The Texas Tribune, former editor in chief of Texas Monthly magazine
 Laura Sullivan, Investigative Correspondent for NPR and Frontline and winner of three Peabody Awards 
 Margaret M. Sullivan, public editor, The New York Times
 Lynn Sweet, Washington, D.C., bureau chief and columnist, Chicago Sun-Times
 Diane S. Sykes, federal judge on the United States Court of Appeals for the Seventh Circuit
 Judy Baar Topinka, former Illinois State Treasurer and Illinois Republican gubernatorial candidate
 Julia Wallace, editor of four metropolitan daily newspapers including Atlanta Journal-Constitution (2002-2010), professor at Walter Cronkite School of Journalism and Mass Communication at Arizona State University
 Nicolle Wallace, former White House Communications Director, best-selling author, and senior adviser to McCain-Palin campaign
 Laura S. Washington, Chicago journalist, former editor of The Chicago Reporter 
 David Weigel, national political correspondent for The Washington Post
 Gary Weiss, author and investigative reporter
 Steve Weissman, ESPN SportsCenter anchor
 Michael Wilbon, ESPN personality (Pardon the Interruption) and The Washington Post sports columnist

References

External links
 
Medill News Service Chicago
Medill News Service DC
Medill Innocence Project
Media Management Center: Northwestern University's Media Research and Education Center
Media Info Center Presented by the Northwestern University Media Management Center

Educational institutions established in 1921
Journalism schools in the United States
Northwestern University
1921 establishments in Illinois
Wrongful conviction advocacy